Phil Esbenshade, also known as Phil E., was born in Philadelphia, Pennsylvania. He was a well known professional skateboarder in the second skateboard heyday of the late 1980s. Five pro model skateboard decks bearing his name and 'E' initial were made by Skull Skates. Also on the Skull Skates team at the time were Duane Peters, Josh Marlowe, Dave Hackett, and Steve Olson. He retired from the sport in the 1990s and later became a Prosecutor  and College Professor  in California's Central Valley.

Esbenshade also played bass guitar and sang in the underground indie rock band Custom Floor with Miki Vuckovich, Garry Davis, and then later, Atom Willard (longtime drummer for Rocket From The Crypt, The Offspring, Angels & Airwaves, and currently for Against Me!.) Goldenrod Records released one 7" for Custom Floor while Phil was in the band on Goldenrod Records.

Phil E. appeared in Transworld Skateboarding magazine, Thrasher Magazine, Freestylin', Homeboy Magazine, Warp Magazine, Skateboard!(UK), Poweredge Magazine, and Concrete Wave Magazine numerous times between 1987-1992. Phil's sponsors included Skull Skates, Gullwing Trucks, Santa Cruz Speed Wheels (OJ Wheels), Venture Trucks, Smallroom, Zorlac Skateboards, and G&S Skateboards. He was also featured in the skate videos "Skateboarding Inside Out", G&S Team Video, and Quiksilver's "Mondo Xtreme Experiment."

Photos of Phil Esbenshade appear in the photography book, "Rat a Tat Tat Birds" by Jeff Winterberg.

Esbenshade is an alumnus of the University of La Verne, earning a Juris Doctor Degree in 2003, and graduated from San Diego Miramar College.

References

External links
The Phil E. Pro Model skateboard was reissued on May 1, 2018 by Skull Skates:
Skull Skates Phil E.'s sponsor

American skateboarders
Living people
United States International University alumni
Sportspeople from Philadelphia
Year of birth missing (living people)
California lawyers
Musicians from California
University of La Verne alumni